This list of shtetls and shtots (eastern European towns and cities with significant pre-Holocaust Jewish populations) is organized by country. 

Some villages that are listed at Yad Vashem have not been included here.

Shtetls

Belarus

Lithuania

Poland

Ukraine

Others

Shtots

See also 
List of villages and towns depopulated of Jews during the Holocaust
Where Once We Walked

References

External links 
 JewishGen ShtetLink

Historic Jewish communities
 Shtetls
Jews and Judaism in Europe
 Shtetls